Bang! is the eleventh studio album released by Swiss hard rock band Gotthard. It was released on 14 April 2014 in Europe, through G Records, and on 24 June in North America via The End Records. The album produced 3 singles: "Feel What I Feel", the title track "Bang!" and "Thank You". On 14 October 2014, the band released a video clip for "C'est La Vie".

On 21 November 2014, Gotthard was presented in Chur with a Platinum Award for having sold more than 20.000 copies of the album in Switzerland.

Track listing

Personnel
Gotthard
Nic Maeder – vocals
Leo Leoni – guitars, production
Freddy Scherer – guitars
Marc Lynn – bass
Hena Habegger – drums

Session musicians
 Melody Tibbits – backing vocals on "C'est La Vie"; vocals on "Maybe (Duet version)"

Charts

Weekly charts

Year-end charts

References

2014 albums
Gotthard (band) albums
The End Records albums
Albums produced by Charlie Bauerfeind